Kaczynski or Kaczyński (feminine: Kaczyńska, plural: Kaczyńscy) is a Polish-language surname. Its Lithuanian equivalent is Kačinskas.

People 
 Aleksandra Kaczyńska (born 1954), Polish rower
 Andrew Kaczynski (born 1989), American journalist and political reporter for CNN
 Andrzej Kaczyński, Polish bass guitar player or Indukti
 Barbara Kaczynski, NFL Chief Financial Officer
 Bogusław Kaczyński (born 1942–2016), Polish classical music journalist
 Czeslaw Kaczynski, pianist, Conservatoire de musique du Québec à Trois-Rivières founder
 David Kaczynski (born 1949), American activist, Theodore Kaczynski's brother
 Filip Kaczyński (born 1987), Polish politician
 Greg Kaczynski (born 1976), Dynamite Kablammo comedian
 Harry Kaczynski, American football fullback 
 Jan Kaczynski, soccer manager
 Jarosław Kaczyński (born 1949), Polish politician, former prime minister of Poland
 Lech Kaczyński (1949–2010), Polish politician, former president of Poland, Jarosław Kaczyński's twin brother
 Maria Kaczyńska (1942–2010), Polish economist, Lech Kaczyński's wife
 Richard Kaczynski (born 1963), American writer
 Ryszard Kaczyński (born 1954), Polish politician
 Sophie Kaczynski, character from 2 Broke Girls, played by Jennifer Coolidge
 Stanislaus Katczinsky, All Quiet on the Western Front character
 Steve Kaczynski, Remke Markets president 
 Ted Kaczynski (born 1942), American mathematician, social critic, and serial terrorist mail-bomber known as the Unabomber
 Thomas Kaczynski Jr. (born c. 1955), American politician

See also
 
 
 Kaczynski towers, Espace Léopold, Brussels, Belgium
 Kuczynski
 Kuczyńskie
 Kucinski
 Kulczyński

Polish-language surnames